Daphne Loves Derby is an American Indie rock band that formed in Kent, Washington, in 2001. They have released three studio albums, the third in 2007 titled Good Night, Witness Light, peaking at number 30 on the Billboard Top Heatseekers chart. The band was featured on Billboard's official website following the release of the album.

Background
Much of their popularity comes from the website PureVolume, where they were the first band to a million plays. (They now have over 5,600,000 plays) For a time, they held the number one spot on PureVolume's Unsigned Artists page, but in 2005 they signed onto Outlook Music/Universal Records. The band has been featured in the Bamboozle Left tours numerous times, as well as playing the Ernie Ball "local heroes" stage at Warped Tour. They have had several releases, including their self-titled debut album, On the Strength of All Convinced, which was released on July 26, 2005.  Their latest album, Good Night, Witness Light, was released on March 27, 2007. On March 3, 2011, The California Aggie online edition posted an interview with the band where Sparks said "We actually just recorded an album and we're working with a label to hopefully release it this summer. It was a good process and we recorded the whole thing in two weeks. So right now we're still kind of stewing on the extra thing to do with it."

On December 29, 2015, Kenny Choi and Jason Call appeared on The Casey Bates Podcast. On the program, they discussed their early history, their decision to stop touring, and streamed three previously unreleased songs.

On June 24, 2016 Jason Call posted a new Daphne Loves Derby track titled "Horrible Sound" online.

On December 10, 2021 Jason Call released a new Daphne Loves Derby song titled “Waking Up”. The track was an unreleased demo of Kenny Choi’s that Jason re-produced and re-recorded.

Members

Current members
 Kenny Choi  - Vocals/Lyrics/Rhythm Guitar
 Jason Call - Bass/Vocals/Guitar/Piano
 Stu Clay - Drums

Past members
 Spencer Abbott - Lead Guitar
 David Sparks - Bass/Vocals
 Nik Kosty - Lead Guitar
 Joe Kosty - Bass

Touring members
 Jude Zadaski - Keyboard (2008)

Discography

Albums
 Daphne Loves Derby (2003)
 On the Strength of All Convinced (2005)
 Good Night, Witness Light (2007)

EPs
A Sudden Change EP (2001)
The Wonder Years EP (2003)
Post Post EP (2004)
Closing Down the Pattern Department (2004)
Calm the Jock Down (2006)
Acoustic EP (2006)
Horrible Sound EP (2017)
Odds & End (2021)

Videography
Hammers and Hearts (2005)
Sundays (2006)
That's Our Hero Shot (2007)
Stranger, You and I (2007)

References

External links
Myspace
Purevolume
LiveJournal Community

Indie rock musical groups from Washington (state)
Musical groups established in 2001
People from Kent, Washington